Short-time working or short time is a governmental unemployment insurance system in which private sector employees agree to or are forced to accept a reduction in working time and pay, with the state making up for all or part of the lost wages.

Several European countries operate short-time schemes to limit the impact of recessions on the economy and on employees. Their intent is to enable companies to avoid layoffs or bankruptcies during a recession because of the state's wage subsidies. Short-time programs have notably been used as an instrument against the COVID-19 recession in 2020.

Austria
In Austria, the introduction of short time requires a special arrangement between what are called the "social partners" of Austrian collective bargaining (which is to say, the Chamber of Commerce and the labour unions), who negotiate on behalf of the employer and affected staff the scope of the  arrangement in terms of the staff covered, the maximum period of its application, the conditions for any lay-offs during the arrangement, and the scope of any professional training or re-training courses included.

Czech Republic
Amid the COVID-19 pandemic in the Czech Republic, the government of Czech Republic Andrej Babiš announced plans to partially subsidise salaries of employees on reduced work schedules, covering 50-70% of pay for 1, 2, or up to 4 days per week that employees are at home due to shocks to companies coming from pandemics or natural disasters. Employers have to cover health and social insurance for the days when workers are at home, and employees contribute by the partial reduction in their pay.

Germany
It was in Germany that a system of "Kurzarbeitergeld" (or "short-time work benefit") was first introduced, on 25 May 1910, to address a downturn in the potash mining and fertiliser industry; it became fully established in 1924 in response to the first economic crisis of the Weimar Republic.   Under the scheme temporarily laid-off workers receive payments, now from the Federal Employment Agency (BA), the agency that is also responsible for issuing unemployment benefit.  Under the scheme, the companies pay the hours actually worked at the original salary, while the state (or the BA, precisely) compensates 60 percent of the original pay for each hour not worked. This means that an individual might work 30 per cent less while experiencing only a 10 per cent loss in income.

In 2009, the German government had budgeted 5.1 billion euros on the program, which replaced some of the lost income of over 1.4 million workers. The program was favorably cited in a 2009 Organisation for Economic Co-operation and Development (OECD) report, which stated that it had saved nearly 500,000 jobs during the recession. It is "widely considered the gold standard of such programs", according to the IMF. Besides helping to avoid mass layoffs, proponents of the program also cite its keeping skilled work groups together and avoiding the atrophy of their skills during extended layoffs, while critics have expressed concerns about its expense and that it might prop up non-viable firms.

During the COVID-19 pandemic, the level of the compensation for cut hours was raised. If working hours are reduced by at least 50%, the "Kurzarbeitergeld" covers 70% of the lost salary from the 4th to 6th month, and 80% from the 7th month onward. This change to the original scheme is applicable until 31. December 2021. Furthermore, the maximum duration was extended to 24 months, up to 31. December 2021, if the short-time-work has already started in 2020.

Romania 
Due to the economic difficulties due to the COVID-19 pandemic, the Romanian government is considering adopting a measure based on the German model of Kurzarbeit.

See also
 Furlough, a temporary layoff legal in the United States (term also used for a similar instrument in the United Kingdom during the COVID-19 pandemic in 2020)
 Job sharing, also called work sharing
 Unemployment

References

External links
 International Law Office: Kurzarbeit: An Alternative to Lay-Offs
 Paul Krugman -- Kurzarbeit
 Kurzarbeit, "living-dead capitalism," and the future of the left
 New York Times: Germany’s Secrets for a Steadier Job Market

Social programs
Unemployment
Working time